Ikwo is the largest Local Government Area in Ebonyi State. It is situated on the eastern part of the state. The city and local government area  has a land mass of approximately 500 square kilometers and shares a border with Abakaliki, Izzi and Ezza Local Government Areas as well as Cross River State. It is the home land of a former Governor of the state Chief Martin Elechi. Ikwo is the home to Alex Ekwueme Federal University Ndufu Alike Ikwo (FUNAI)  One of the Universities established by president Goodluck Jonathan. Ikwo also plays host to Ebonyi State College of Education, Ikwo at Ndufu Echara.

The local government headquarters is at Onu-Ebonyi Echara.

Ikwo have boundary with Cross River State

Culture and Society
The people of Ikwo have a rich culture. Community and family are highly valued. Burials and marriage ceremonies are both treated with fanfare. Several masquerades are part of these ceremonies. Dance groups are common place. The Ikwo version of igbo language is generally spoken.

See also
Ikwo people
List of Governors of Ebonyi State

External links 
funai.edu.ng website of Federal University, Ndufu Alike Ikwo
Approved/Accredited Programmes of Nigerian Universities, National Universities Commission, January 2012
  Ebonyi Online

Local Government Areas in Ebonyi State